William V of Angoulême, also known as William Taillefer III was the twelfth count of Angoulême.

William V was born in 1084, the son of Count Fulk of Angoulême and the grandson of Geoffrey of Angoulême and Petronille de Archiac. William III's reign lasted from 1089 until 1118 or 1120.

In 1108 he married Vitapoy de Benauges. They had one son, who succeeded William V as the thirteenth count of Angoulême.

Wulgrin II of Angoulême

Notes

References

Histoire P@ssion - Chronologie historique des Comtes d’Angoulême (in French)
L'art de Verifier des Faits historiquws, des Chartes, des Chroniques, et Autres Anciens Monuments, Depuis la Naissance de Notre-Seigner by Moreau et Yalade, 1818, Page 184
The coinage of the European continent, by Swan Sonnenschein, 1893,  Page 276
Annuaire Historique Pour L'annee 1854, by Société de l'histoire de France, Page 179
Nouvelle Encyclopedie Theologique, by Jacques-Paul Migne, 1854, Page 903

Counts of Angoulême
House of Taillefer
1084 births
Year of death unknown

pt:Guilherme IV de Angoulême